Edward J. Henderson (December 25, 1884 – January 15, 1964), born Eugene Johnson Ball, was a professional baseball pitcher.

External links

1884 births
1964 deaths
Pittsburgh Rebels players
Indianapolis Hoosiers players
Major League Baseball pitchers
Baseball players from Newark, New Jersey
Binghamton Bingoes players
Lowell Grays players
Burials at Long Island National Cemetery
Easton (minor league baseball) players